General Freddy José Padilla de León (born 10 October 1948) is a retired General of the Army of Colombia and currently serves as Ambassador of Colombia to Austria and Permanent Representative to the United Nations Office at Vienna. Prior to this diplomatic post General Padilla served as the General Commander of the Armed Forces of Colombia from 2006 to 2010, and as such assumed the Ministry of National Defence ad interim in 2009.

Ambassadorship
As Ambassador to Austria, Gen. Padilla is also accredited as Resident Representative to the various United Nations programmes and agencies located at the United Nations Office at Vienna. He presented his Letters of Credence to the Executive Director of the United Nations Office on Drugs and Crime, Yuri Fedotov on 13 October, to the Director General of the International Atomic Energy Agency, Yukiya Amano on 28 October, to the Director General of the United Nations Industrial Development Organization, Kandeh K. Yumkella on 1 November.

As Ambassador of Colombia to Austria, Gen Padilla is dually accredited as Non-Resident Ambassador to the Czech Republic, the Republic of Hungary, the Republic of Serbia, the Republic of Slovenia, the Republic of Slovakia, the Republic of Croatia, and the Republic of Turkey. In this capacity, Gen Padilla presented his Letters of Credence to the different heads of state or representatives, first to the President of the Czech Republic, Václav Klaus on 11 April 2011 at Prague Castle, then to the President of Hungary, Pál Schmitt on 31 May 2011, to the President of Slovakia, Ivan Gašparovič on 12 July at the Grassalkovich Palace, and to Igor Senčar, the Director-General of the Directorate for European Affairs and Bilateral Political Relations at the Slovenian Ministry of Foreign Affairs, on 14 July,

References

1948 births
Living people
People from Montería
Colombian industrial engineers
Colombian generals
Colombian Ministers of Defense
Ambassadors of Colombia to Austria
Ambassadors of Colombia to the Czech Republic
Ambassadors of Colombia to Croatia
Ambassadors of Colombia to Hungary
Ambassadors of Colombia to Serbia
Ambassadors of Colombia to Slovakia
Ambassadors of Colombia to Slovenia
Ambassadors of Colombia to Turkey